Nicodemus Kirima (March 3, 1936 – November 27, 2007) was the Roman Catholic Archbishop of Nyeri. Kirima served as the Bishop of the Diocese of Nyeri since 1988 when he was appointed to succeed the late Bishop Caesar Gatimu.

Early life
Nicodemus Kirima was born on 1936 in Karatina, Nyeri District, Kenya. He was ordained as a Catholic priest on December 22, 1962.

Bishop
Kirima was appointed the Roman Catholic Bishop of Mombasa in February 1978. He was appointed as Bishop of Niyeri in 1988 to replace the late Bishop Caesar Gatimu.

Pope John Paul II elevated Kirima to metropolitan see in May 1990. As a result, Kirima was given the title of Archbishop Nicodemus Kirima. In 1994 he appointed chair of the Devil Worship Commission by then President Daniel arap Moi

Archbishop Kirima underwent a kidney transplant in 2002 when his brother donated one of his kidneys to him. His health remained good until 2006 when Kirima developed kidney failure while on a trip to the United States. His health continued to deteriorate over the next year. He lapsed into a coma on November 4, 2007, while visiting Consolata Mission Hospital-Mathari, where he was receiving kidney dialysis. He was airlifted to Nairobi Hospital for treatment but did not recover.

Archbishop Nicodemus Kirima died at Nairobi Hospital in Nairobi, Kenya, on November 27, 2007, of kidney complications. He was 71 years old.

External links
Catholic  Hierarchy: Archbishop Nicodemus Kirima † biography
https://www.catholicnewsagency.com/news/kenyan_archbishop_kirima_dies
In 1994 he was appointed by the then president Daniel arap Moi to head a committee to investigate devil worshipping.

References

1936 births
2007 deaths
Deaths from kidney failure
20th-century Roman Catholic archbishops in Kenya
21st-century Roman Catholic archbishops in Kenya
People from Nyeri County
Roman Catholic bishops of Mombasa
Roman Catholic archbishops of Nyeri